Rachel is  the second wife of Jacob in the Hebrew Bible.

Rachel may also refer to:

People
 Rachel (given name), a female name (including a list of people and characters with the name)
 Rachel Bluwstein, a Hebrew-language poet often referred to simply as Rachel or Rachel the Poetess
 Rachel, wife of Rabbi Akiva, a 1st-century CE resident of Judea who is mentioned in the Talmud and Aggadah

Media and entertainment

Films
 Rachel (film) (2009), a 2009 documentary about the death of Rachel Corrie
 Rachel, Rachel (1968), a 1968 film starring Joanne Woodward and directed by Paul Newman

Literature
 Rachel (play), 1916 play by Angelina Weld Grimké
 Rachel (Animorphs), a character from the Animorphs book series by K. A. Applegate
 Rachel (story), a short story by Erskine Caldwell, included in We Are the Living (1933)
 My Cousin Rachel (1951), a novel by Daphne du Maurier
 Rachel, in the novel Moby-Dick (Chapter 128) a whaling vessel that solicits Captain Ahab's aid in finding the lost son of the Rachel's captain; Ahab refuses. In the novel's last lines, the Rachel rescues Ishmael.

Music
 "Rachel" (song), a song by Australian singer Russell Morris
 Rachel's, an American post-rock group

Other media and entertainment
 Rachel Green (e), a fictional character on Friends
 Rachel, the lead soprano role in the 1835 opera La Juive

Places in the United States
 Rachel, Nevada, a census-designated place
 Rachel, West Virginia, a census-designated place

Other uses
 Rachel (Gerber), an outdoor bronze sculpture of a piggy bank, Seattle, Washington, U.S.
 Rachel (sandwich), a type of sandwich
 Rachel (sculpture), a 1540s sculpture by Michelangelo
 Rachel Alexandra (foaled 2006), an American Thoroughbred racehorse
 Rachel haircut, a haircut based on the Friends character Rachel Green
 RACHEL, Software for Raspberry Pi computer (Remote Area Community Hotspot for Education and Learning)
 Student Initiative Rahel, a former initiative in Germany for funding an educational project in Ethiopia

See also
 Rachal (disambiguation)